Andrew J. Ouderkirk is a widely recognized senior scientist at 3M, an American multinational conglomerate. He was elected a member of the National Academy of Engineering in 2005 for the development and commercialization of multilayer polymer films with unique optical properties. He is prolific inventor listed on 308 U.S. patents as of September 29, 2020 and a principal developer of a class of highly efficient polymer-based mirrors
Dr. Ouderkirk currently works for Oculus Research.

See also
 3M
 List of prolific inventors
 Materials Science
 Oculus VR

References

Year of birth missing (living people)
Living people